Barbro Feltzing (born April 24, 1945) is a Swedish Green Party politician, member of the Riksdag 1994–2006.

References

1945 births
20th-century Swedish women politicians
20th-century Swedish politicians
21st-century Swedish women politicians
Living people
Members of the Riksdag 1994–1998
Members of the Riksdag 1998–2002
Members of the Riksdag 2002–2006
Members of the Riksdag from the Green Party
Place of birth missing (living people)
Women members of the Riksdag